Moor Grange County Secondary School was an all-boys school located in the Leeds postal district of Leeds 16 at the junction of Parkstone Avenue and the West Park section of the Leeds Outer Ring Road. Although it was named Moor Grange, it was actually located in the Ireland Wood area with Moor Grange Estate being located just across the ring road. The school has a main section four stories high. The science block was located on the top of a two-storey building above the wood work, metal work, science and art rooms. It also had a set of annexes used as classrooms adjacent to the playground. The school was later renamed Moor Grange High School in the 1970s. It was demolished in the late 1980s and is now home to Her Majesty's Revenue and Customs house and a new road named Redvers Close. 

The school opened in 1960 and was filled by boys in years from West Park County Secondary School nearby which reverted to its original purpose as an all-girls school from September 1961 after the last class of boys graduated.

Appearances in popular culture
The school staff room and hall were used for the filming of The Beiderbecke Tapes in 1987, shortly before the schools demolition. However, the exterior shots of the school were that of Foxwood School in Seacroft.

Notable pupils
 Sir Ian McGeechan OBE (rugby union player and coach)

References 

Defunct schools in Leeds
Educational institutions established in 1960
1960 establishments in England
Demolished buildings and structures in England